Darlington Hebrew Congregation, a member of the Movement for Reform Judaism, is a Reform Judaism congregation at 15 Bloomfield Road in Darlington, County Durham, in the north-east of England.  The congregation, which dates from 1904 and was originally an Orthodox community, has a historic burial ground and a current burial ground at West Cemetery, Carmel Road North, Darlington. Shabbat services are held monthly.

See also
 List of Jewish communities in the United Kingdom
 List of former synagogues in the United Kingdom
 Movement for Reform Judaism

References

External links
Official website
Darlington Hebrew Congregation on Jewish Small Communities website
Darlington Hebrew Congregation on Jewish Communities and Records – UK (hosted by JewishGen)

1904 establishments in England
Darlington
Jewish organizations established in 1904
Reform synagogues in the United Kingdom